Terken Khatun (1053 – September–October 1094) was the second/third wife and chief consort of Malik Shah I, Sultan of the Seljuk Empire from 1072, until his death in 1092. She was born as a Karakhanid princess, the daughter of Tamghach Khan Ibrahim. She was the mother of Mahmud I, the next ruler of the Seljuk Empire, and regent during his minority in 1092–1094.

Early life
Terken Khatun was born in 1053. Her father was Tamghach Khan Ibrahim, the ruler of the Kara-Khanid Khanate. She had a brother, Shams al-Mulk Nasr.

Marriage

Alp Arslan, father of Malik-Shah gave his own daughter Aisha Khatun to Shams al-Mulk Nasr, the son and successor of the Qara Khanid Tamghach Khan Ibrahim, Terkhan Khatun's father. Later in 1065 he married his son to Terken Khatun, who was aged twelve at the time and Malik-Shah was about the same age. The two together had five sons, Dawud, Abu Shuja Ahmad, Sultan Mahmud I, born in 1087–8, Abu'l-Qasim, who died in childhood, another son who died in childhood, and was buried in Ray, and a daughter, Mah-i Mulk Khatun, who married Abbasid Caliph Al-Muqtadi in 1082.

Nizam al-Mulk's position vis-à-vis the sultan was thus to some extent unsatisfactory, and his influence at the subordinate households of the sultan's wives and those of the princes was still weaker. Terken Khatun's household became the focus of opposition, for Taj al-Mulk was also her personal intendant. The vizier doubtless had Terken Khatun in mind when in the Siyasat-Nama he denounced the malevolent influence of women at court, citing their misleading advice to the ruler and their susceptibility to promptings from their attendants and eunuchs. Terken Khatun's son Dawud had been his father's favourite son, but he died in 1082. Six years later Malik-Shah had capital approval when he proclaimed as heir another of his sons, Abu Shuja Ahmad, and gave him a resplendent string of honorifics, but in the following year he too died. After these disappointments it was not surprising that Terken Khatun wanted to promote the succession of her third son Mahmud, despite the fact that he was the youngest of all the possible candidates. 

Towards the end of Malik-Shah's reign, Qodun, the shahna of Marv, complained to the Sultan that he had been seized by Nizam al-Mulk's son, Shams al-Din Uthman who was rais of Marv. Malik Shah wrote to Nizam al-Mulk reproaching him with these words, "These your children have each gained the mastery over a large district and govern large province. But this does not satisfy them and they exceed what a politic and desire to do this and that." Nizam al-Mulk defended himself but on this occasion the Sultan's jealousy was not assuaged and he began to plot against the life of the vizier. Terken Khatun added fuel to the fire, accusing Nizam al-Mulk of dividing the kingdom among his children. Her opposition to Nizam al-Mulk was due to his having urged Malik Shah to nominate Berkyaruq, the thirteen year old son of Zubayda Khatun, heir apparent, whereas she wished her own son Mahmud, an infant, to be so nominated and was supported in this by Taj al-Mulk, who was vizier to Terken Khatun. She joined an intrigue mounted against Nizam al-Mulk by Taj al-Mulk, Majid al-Mulk Baravistani Qummi, the mustaufi, Sadid al-Mulk, the aird.

Regency

In 1092, when Malik Shah I was assassinated shortly after Nizam al-Mulk, Taj al-Mulk nominated Mahmud as Sultan and set out for Isfahan. Mahmud was a child, and his mother Terken Khatun wished to seize power in his name. To accomplish this, she entered in negotiations with her son-in-law, the Abbasid Caliph al-Muqtadi, to secure her rule.  The Caliph opposed both a child and a woman as ruler, and could not be persuaded to allow the khutba, the sign of the sovereign, to be proclaimed in the name of a woman.   

Eventually, however, the Caliph agreed to let her govern if the khutba was said in the name of her son, and if she did so assisted by a vizier he appointed for her, a condition to which she saw herself forced to accept.  She was thus not formally a regent, but she secured the reigns of power de facto with al-Shirazi as vizier and Unar as army commander.
She was openly acknowledged to be the ruler and manager of the institutions and political and military business of the state otherwise the privilege of a male ruler, and the phrase "khatun dispatched the armies to fight" was often named, illustrating her authority to command the military issues of the state. 

On arrival in Isfahan, Taj al-Mulk seized and imprisoned Barkiyaruq on Terken Khatun's orders, but the Nizamiyya mamluks, who hated Terken Khatun because of her enmity to their late master, set Barkiyaruq free and took him to Ray, where the rais of the city, Nizam al-Mulk's son-in-law crowned him. 

Taj al-Mulk and Terken Khatun set out after Barkiyaruq, but were defeated at Borujerd in 1092–93. Terken Khatun retired with her forces to Isfahan, where she was besieged. Taj al-Mulk who had fled at the battle of Borujerd, meanwhile came to Barkiyaruq and offered him 200,000 dinars to make him vizier.

Death
From Isfahan Terken Khatun tried to make contact with Tulush, but she died suddenly in 1094, to be followed a month later by her son Mahmud.

References

Bibliography

Seljuk dynasty
11th-century women rulers
1094 deaths
11th-century births
Princesses
11th-century Turkic women
Turkic female royalty